Samuel Rodriguez Jr. (born September 29, 1969) is an Evangelical American Christian leader born to Puerto Rican parents in the United States. He is a pastor, movie producer, author, civil rights activist and television personality. He is the president of the National Hispanic Christian Leadership Conference.

Ministry 
At age 16, Rodriguez delivered his first sermon. He quickly grew to be a leading and acclaimed evangelical preacher. In 1992, he became an ordained minister in the Assemblies of God, a Pentecostal denomination. In 2000, he founded the National Hispanic Christian Leadership Conference (NHCLC/CONEL), the largest Hispanic Evangelical Christian organization in the world. With over 40,000 Latino Evangelical churches as members, NHCLC/CONEL helps to cultivate a network of Latino leaders in the Christian community.

Rodriguez became a member of the board of the National Association of Evangelicals in 2006.

Books and films
In June 2016, Rodriguez's book, Be Light, reached #1 on the Los Angeles Times Bestseller List. You Are Next, released in 2019, was a Publishers Weekly bestseller.

Persevere with Power, Rodriguez's 2021 release, made both English and Spanish best-seller status on ECPA's Christian Bestsellers Lists, as well as reaching #20 on ECPA's January 2022 Christian New Releases.

Rodriguez was the executive producer for the 20th Century Fox motion picture Breakthrough, which received an Oscar nomination for Best Original Song  and received a GMA Dove Award for Inspirational Film of the Year. In 2019, Rodriguez was announced as the executive producer for the Fox Searchlight film Flamin Hot, a true story about the man behind Flamin' Hot Cheetos. The film was produced by DeVon Franklin of Franklin Entertainment and directed by Eva Longoria.

Political activity 
During the George W. Bush administration, Rodriguez advocated for bipartisan discussion on immigration reform. He was brought in as an advisor to President Bush and later also served in an advisory capacity for Presidents Obama and Trump. He participated in President Obama’s 2009 inaugural prayer service at Saint Johns Episcopal Church, reading from the Gospel of Luke. As a spokesperson for Hispanic evangelicals, Rodriguez has been a featured speaker in White House and congressional meetings. He has served on the President's Advisory Council for the White House Office of Faith-Based and Neighborhood Partnerships initiative with the Fatherhood and Healthy Families Task Force and also on the Abortion Reduction Task Force (both under President Obama).

Rodriguez was invited to offer readings and deliver an invocation at the inauguration of Donald Trump on January 20, 2017. In his remarks, Rodriguez read from the Sermon on the Mount in Matthew 5. On Inauguration Day, Rodriguez was interviewed by CNN. Rodriguez met with Trump administration officials to discuss a comprehensive immigration reform measure that would provide a path to citizenship for undocumented immigrants.

In a letter acquired by Politico in January 2017, Rodriguez was one of several evangelical leaders that pressed President Trump to reconsider the suspension of the refugee resettlement program that temporarily prevented refugees from several countries from emigrating to the U.S. The letter argued that the program provided a lifeline to many oppressed individuals and an opportunity for churches to minister to them.

On January 25, 2017, Rodriguez issued a statement indicating he agreed with President Trump that securing the U.S/Mexico border was vital for the safety of the U.S. He added that he opposed forcibly removing undocumented individuals and families already in the U.S. (with the exception of criminals and drug dealers).

Also in 2017, Rodriguez was involved in a conversation at the White House with Jared Kushner and Ivanka Trump that led to the creation of the First Step Act, which helps to prevent individuals who have served time from returning to prison. At the onset of the COVID-19 pandemic, Rev. Rodriguez joined the Heritage Foundation as a spokesperson for the National Coronavirus Recovery Commission.

Rev. Rodriguez signed an amicus brief on behalf of the NHCLC along with the Frederick Douglas Foundation, Dr. Alveda King, Deacon Keith Fournier, Esq., and the Roman Catholic Diocese of Tyler, which was cited in the historical Dobbs v. Jackson case that overturned Roe v. Wade in June 2022.

Recognition
In 2008, Newsweek called Rodriguez one of the "Top 12 People to Look For." Presented by the Congress of Racial Equality in 2011, Rodriguez was awarded the Martin Luther King Jr. Leadership Award. In 2013, Rodriguez received a nomination for Time Magazine's "Top 100 Most Influential People." That same year, he became the first Latino keynote speaker at the annual Martin Luther King, Jr. Commemorative Service. Rodriguez has been a part of the Martin Luther King, Jr. Commemorative Service four times (2010, 2011, 2013 and 2021); he is the only person to be features on this many occasions. In 2015, Latino Leaders Magazine included him on their "101 Most Influential Leaders" list as the first evangelical leader to make the list. The Wall St. Journal has called Rodriguez one of the top 12 latino leaders. Rodriguez was also included in Charisma Magazine's "40 People Who Radically Changed Our World" series. He has received honorary doctorates from William Jessup University, Northwest University and Baptist University of the Americas. Rodriguez regularly comments for publications and media outlets such as CNN, Fox News, PBS, Telemundo, NBC and others.

In 2015, Rodriguez and his wife, Eva, received The Rosa Parks Courage Award for their civil rights work from the Southern Youth Leadership Development Institute (SYLDI) and the Montgomery Improvement Association (MIA). The award was granted in commemoration of the 60th anniversary of the Montgomery Bus Boycott.

In 2021, Rodriguez was named in 'Israel's Top 50 Christian Allies' by The Israel Allies Foundation. This exclusive list selects Christian leaders who remain steadfast in their love and support of Israel, which stems from their Christian faith.

In 2022. Deseret Magazine named Rodriguez one of their 20 “New Reformers,” referring to faith leaders “challenging the conservative movement to change,” citing his advocacy for granting immigrants immediate citizenship.

Filmography

References

1969 births
American people of Puerto Rican descent
American evangelists
Living people